Rainbow Range  may refer to:

Rainbow Range (Chilcotin Plateau), a mountain range in British Columbia, Canada
Rainbow Range (Rocky Mountains), a small subrange of the Rocky Mountains in British Columbia, Canada

See also
 Rainbow Mountain (disambiguation)